Clevinger Branch is a stream in southwestern Taney County in the U.S. state of Missouri. The stream is a tributary of the Long Creek branch of Table Rock Lake.

Clevinger Branch has the name of Judge Clevinger, a pioneer citizen.

See also
List of rivers of Missouri

References

Rivers of Taney County, Missouri
Rivers of Missouri